The term weal may refer to:

 Happiness, positive or pleasant emotions ranging from contentment to intense joy
 Prosperity, the state of flourishing, thriving, good fortune or good social status
 Wealth, abundance of valuable resources or material possessions
 Well-being, a healthy, happy, and prosperous condition
 Welt, a ridge on the body caused by a blow from a slender object, such as a whip or stick

WEAL may refer to:

 WEAL, a gospel-themed AM radio station in Greensboro, North Carolina, USA
 Women's Equity Action League, United States women's rights organization founded in 1968 and disbanded in 1989

See also
 Quality of life, an assessment of the general well-being of individuals and societies
 Wheal, a rounded or flat-topped, pale-red papule or plaque that is characteristically evanescent; temporary raised bubble of taut skin on the site of an intradermal injection